Greenwich was a constituency in south-east London, which returned at first two, then (from 1885) one member (MP) to the House of Commons of the UK Parliament. It existed from 1832 to 1997. Elections used the first past the post system; when this elects more than one member, it is sometimes called plurality-at-large voting.

History
From 1832 until 1885 it was a two-member constituency. Under the Redistribution of Seats Act 1885 associated with the Reform Act 1884, its area was reduced overall (although it gained Kidbrooke) and it was reduced to one seat. For the 1997 general election, it was merged with part of the former Woolwich constituency to form the Greenwich and Woolwich seat.

Its history is dominated by the area's strong maritime tradition. Its most prominent claim to fame was as the seat of William Ewart Gladstone between 1868 and 1880, and it also achieved prominence in the 1987 Greenwich by-election, when the SDP won a surprise victory.

Boundaries
1832–1885: the parishes of Greenwich; St Nicholas and St Paul Deptford; and the most populous parts of Charlton and Woolwich. detailed as: "From the Point at which the Royal Arsenal Canal at Woolwich joins the Thames, along the said Canal to the southern extremity thereof; thence in a straight Line to the south-western corner of the Ordnance Storekeeper's House; thence in a straight Line, in the Direction of a Stile in the footpath from Woolwich to Plumstead Common, over Sand Hill, to the Boundary of the Parish of Woolwich; thence, southward, along the boundary of the parish of Woolwich to the point at which the same meets the Boundary of the parish of Charlton; thence westward along the Boundary of the parish of Charlton to the point at which the same turns southward near the Dovor Road; thence along the Dovor Road to the nearest point of the boundary of the parish of Greenwich; thence Westward, along the boundary of the parish of Greenwich to the point at which the same turns abruptly to the south, close by the Dovor Road, thence in a straight line, in a westerly direction, to the nearest point of the boundary of the parish of Greenwich, thence westward along the boundary of the parish of Greenwich to the point at which the same meets the boundary of the parish of Saint Paul Deptford; thence southward along the boundary of the parish of Saint Paul Deptford to the point at which the same meets the Thames; thence along the Thames to the point first described." The boundaries were thus in the schedules of the Parliamentary Boundaries Act 1832.

1885–1918: The parishes of Greenwich, St Nicholas Deptford, Charlton, and Kidbrooke.

1918–1974: The Metropolitan Borough of Greenwich.

1974–1983: The London Borough of Greenwich wards of Blackheath, Charlton, Eastcombe, Hornfair, Kidbrooke, Marsh, Park, Trafalgar, Vanbrugh, and West.

1983–1997: The London Borough of Greenwich wards of Blackheath, Charlton, Ferrier, Hornfair, Kidbrooke, Rectory Field, St Alfege, Trafalgar, Vanbrugh, and West.

Between 1983 and 1997, the constituency formed the western part of the Royal Borough of Greenwich.

Members of Parliament

MPs 1832–1885

MPs since 1885

Election results

Elections in the 1830s

Elections in the 1840s

 

 

 

Dundas was appointed a Lord Commissioner of the Admiralty, requiring a by-election.

Elections in the 1850s
Barnard's death caused a by-election.

 

Dundas resigned after being appointed Commander of the Mediterranean Fleet, causing a by-election.

 

 

 

Rolt resigned, causing a by-election.

 

 

 

Townsend resigned after becoming a bankrupt, also leading to his suspension from the House of Commons.

Elections in the 1860s

 
 
 

 

 
 

 

Gladstone's appointment as Prime Minister and First Lord of the Treasury caused a by-election.

Elections in the 1870s
Salomons' death caused a by-election.

Elections in the 1880s

Elections in the 1890s

Elections in the 1900s

Cecil was a free-trader and Benn was a supporter of tariff reform

Elections in the 1910s

Elections in the 1920s

Elections in the 1930s

Elections in the 1940s

Elections in the 1950s

Elections in the 1960s

Elections in the 1970s

Elections in the 1980s

swings relative to 1983 election, not 1987 by-election

Elections in the 1990s

The swing for Rosie Barnes is relative to her performance in the 1987 general election.

References

Bibliography

 British Parliamentary Election Results 1885–1918, compiled and edited by F.W.S. Craig (Macmillan Press 1974)
 Debrett’s Illustrated Heraldic and Biographical House of Commons and the Judicial Bench 1886
 Debrett’s House of Commons and the Judicial Bench 1901
 Debrett’s House of Commons and the Judicial Bench 1918

Parliamentary constituencies in London (historic)
Politics of the Royal Borough of Greenwich
Constituencies of the Parliament of the United Kingdom established in 1832
Constituencies of the Parliament of the United Kingdom disestablished in 1997
Constituencies of the Parliament of the United Kingdom represented by a sitting Prime Minister